The Bodiocasses or Baiocasses were an ancient Gallic tribe of the Roman period. They were a tribal division of the civitas of the Lexovii, in the Roman province of Gallia Lugdunensis.

Name 
They are mentioned as Bodiocasses by Pliny (1st c. AD), Ou̓adikássioi (Οὐαδικάσσιοι) by Ptolemy (2nd c. AD), Baiocassi by Ausonius (4th c. AD), and as Baiocas in the Notitia Dignitatum (5th c. AD).

The Gaulish ethnonym Bodiocasses derives from the Proto-Celtic stem *bodyo- ('yellow, blond'; cf. Old Irish buide 'yellow'). The meaning of the second element -casses, attested in other Gaulish ethnonyms such as Durocasses, Sucasses, Tricasses, Veliocasses or Viducasses, has been debated, but it probably signifies '(curly) hair, hairstyle' (cf. Old Irish chass 'curl'), perhaps referring to a particular warrior coiffure. Rudolf Thurneysen has compared the name with the Old Irish buide-chass ('blond curls'), and suggested to translate Bodiocasses as 'those who have blond curls/braids'. Patrizia de Bernardo Stempel has proposed to interpret the name as 'those with shining helmets'.

The city of Bayeux, attested ca. 400 AD as civitas Baiocassium ('civitas of the Baiocasses'; Baiocas in 400–410, Baieus in 1155), and the region of Bessin, attested in 840 AD as pagus Baiocassinus ('pagus of the Baiocasses'; Beissin in 1050–66), all stem from the Gallic tribe.

Geography 
The Baiocasses dwelled in a region located around modern-day Bayeux in western Normandy.

History 
Julius Caesar does not mention the Baiocasses in his commentaries on the Gallic Wars (58–50 BCE), but they are listed in the Notitia dignitatum and are probably the same people Pliny calls Bodiocasses.

The Baiocasses minted base gold, silver and billon (base silver) coins in the denomination of one stater and in the case of gold coins sometimes quarter staters. Most of the coins show a Celtic-style male head with elaborated hair on the obverse, and on the reverse a horse with a chariot rider above or behind, and below usually either a lyre or small boar.  A number of these are in existence.

The 4th-century Bordelaise poet Ausonius teases a friend as a Baiocassis who claimed to be of druidic heritage and descended from priests of Belenus.

References

Bibliography

See also 
Gaul
List of peoples of Gaul
List of Celtic tribes

Gauls
Tribes of pre-Roman Gaul
Historical Celtic peoples
Baiocasses